Scopula superciliata is a moth of the family Geometridae. It was described by Prout in 1913. It is endemic to Japan.

References

Moths described in 1913
superciliata
Moths of Japan
Endemic fauna of Japan